Foziling Reservoir is a reservoir located in Huoshan County, Anhui, China.

History

The reservoir project was started in January 1952 and completed in November 1954, taking two years and ten months. It is the first large-scale water conservancy and hydropower project built after the founding of the Communist State, and Chinese official media call it "the first dam in New China".

Function
The reservoir provides drinking water for locals, and has also become a place for recreation for nearby residents.

See also
List of protected areas of China

References 

Huoshan County
Lakes of Anhui